In materials science, effective medium approximations (EMA) or effective medium theory (EMT) pertain to analytical or theoretical modeling that describes the macroscopic properties of composite materials. EMAs or EMTs are developed from averaging the multiple values of the constituents that directly make up the composite material. At the constituent level, the values of the materials vary and are inhomogeneous. Precise calculation of the many constituent values is nearly impossible. However, theories have been developed that can produce acceptable approximations which in turn describe useful parameters including the effective permittivity and permeability of the materials as a whole. In this sense, effective medium approximations are descriptions of a medium (composite material) based on the properties and the relative fractions of its components and are derived from calculations, and effective medium theory. There are two widely used formulae.

Effective permittivity and permeability are averaged dielectric and magnetic characteristics of a microinhomogeneous medium. They both were derived in quasi-static approximation when the electric field inside a mixture particle may be considered as homogeneous. So, these formulae can not describe the particle size effect. Many attempts were undertaken to improve these formulae.

Applications
There are many different effective medium approximations, each of them being more or less accurate in distinct conditions. Nevertheless, they all assume that the macroscopic system is homogeneous and, typical of all mean field theories, they fail to predict the properties of a multiphase medium close to the percolation threshold due to the absence of long-range correlations or critical fluctuations in the theory.

The properties under consideration are usually the conductivity  or the dielectric constant  of the medium. These parameters are interchangeable in the formulas in a whole range of models due to the wide applicability of the Laplace equation. The problems that fall outside of this class are mainly in the field of elasticity and hydrodynamics, due to the higher order tensorial character of the effective medium constants.

EMAs can be discrete models, such as applied to resistor networks, or continuum theories as applied to elasticity or viscosity. However, most of the current theories have difficulty in describing percolating systems. Indeed, among the numerous effective medium approximations, only Bruggeman's symmetrical theory is able to predict a threshold. This characteristic feature of the latter theory puts it in the same category as other mean field theories of critical phenomena.

Bruggeman's model 

Here positive sign before the square root must be altered to negative sign in some cases in order to get correct imaginary part of effective complex permittivity which is related with electromagnetic wave attenuation. The formula is symmetric with respect to swapping the 'd' and 'm' roles. This formula is based on the equality

where  is the jump of electric displacement flux all over the integration surface,  is the component of microscopic electric field normal to the integration surface,  is the local relative complex permittivity which takes the value  inside the picked metal particle, the value  inside the picked dielectric particle and the value  outside the picked particle,  is the normal component of the macroscopic electric field. Formula (4) comes out of Maxwell's equality . Thus only one picked particle is considered in Bruggeman's approach. Formula (3) gives a reasonable resonant curve for plasmon excitations in metal nanoparticles if their size is 10 nm or smaller. But it is unable to describe the size dependence for the resonant frequency of plasmon excitations that are observed in experiment

Formulas 
Without any loss of generality, we shall consider the study of the effective conductivity (which can be either dc or ac) for a system made up of spherical multicomponent inclusions with different arbitrary conductivities. Then the Bruggeman formula takes the form:

Circular and spherical inclusions 

(The sum over the 's is unity.)

Elliptical and ellipsoidal inclusions 

This is a generalization of Eq. (1) to a biphasic system with ellipsoidal inclusions of conductivity  into a matrix of conductivity . For randomly oriented inclusions,

where the 's denote the appropriate doublet/triplet of depolarization factors which is governed by the ratios between the axis of the ellipse/ellipsoid. For example: in the case of a circle and in the case of a sphere. (The sum over the  's is unity.)

The most general case to which the Bruggeman approach has been applied involves bianisotropic ellipsoidal inclusions.

Derivation 
The figure illustrates a two-component medium. Consider the cross-hatched volume of conductivity , take it as a sphere of volume  and assume it is embedded in a uniform medium with an effective conductivity . If the electric field far from the inclusion is  then elementary considerations lead to a dipole moment associated with the volume

If the average deviation is to vanish, the total polarization summed over the two types of inclusion must vanish. Thus

This can be easily extended to a system of dimension  that has an arbitrary number of components. All cases can be combined to yield Eq. (1).

Eq. (1) can also be obtained by requiring the deviation in current to vanish.
 It has been derived here from the assumption that the inclusions are spherical and it can be modified for shapes with other depolarization factors; leading to Eq. (2).

A more general derivation applicable to bianisotropic materials is also available.

Modeling of percolating systems 
The main approximation is that all the domains are located in an equivalent mean field.
Unfortunately, it is not the case close to the percolation threshold where the system is governed by the largest cluster of conductors, which is a fractal, and long-range correlations that are totally absent from Bruggeman's simple formula.
The threshold values are in general not correctly predicted. It is 33% in the EMA, in three dimensions, far from the 16% expected from percolation theory and observed in experiments. However, in two dimensions, the EMA gives a threshold of 50% and has been proven to model percolation relatively well.

Maxwell Garnett equation 
Maxwell Garnett was the son of physicist William Garnett, and was named after Garnett's friend, James Clerk Maxwell. He proposed his formula to explain colored pictures that are observed in glasses doped with metal nanoparticles. His formula has a form

This formula is based on the equality

Moreover the formula (1) ignores the interaction between single inclusions. Because of these circumstances, formula (1) gives too narrow and too high resonant curve for plasmon excitations in metal nanoparticles of the mixture.

Formula 
The Maxwell Garnett equation reads: 

The Maxwell Garnett equation is solved by:

so long as the denominator does not vanish. A simple MATLAB calculator using this formula is as follows.
% This simple MATLAB calculator computes the effective dielectric
% constant of a mixture of an inclusion material in a base medium
% according to the Maxwell Garnett theory
% INPUTS:
%     eps_base: dielectric constant of base material;
%     eps_incl: dielectric constant of inclusion material;
%     vol_incl: volume portion of inclusion material;
% OUTPUT:
%     eps_mean: effective dielectric constant of the mixture.

function eps_mean = MaxwellGarnettFormula(eps_base, eps_incl, vol_incl)

    small_number_cutoff = 1e-6;

    if vol_incl < 0 || vol_incl > 1
        disp('WARNING: volume portion of inclusion material is out of range!');
    end
    factor_up = 2 * (1 - vol_incl) * eps_base + (1 + 2 * vol_incl) * eps_incl;
    factor_down = (2 + vol_incl) * eps_base + (1 - vol_incl) * eps_incl;
    if abs(factor_down) < small_number_cutoff
        disp('WARNING: the effective medium is singular!');
        eps_mean = 0;
    else
        eps_mean = eps_base * factor_up / factor_down;
    end
end

Derivation 
For the derivation of the Maxwell Garnett equation we start with an array of polarizable particles. By using the Lorentz local field concept, we obtain the Clausius-Mossotti relation:

Where  is the number of particles per unit volume. By using elementary electrostatics, we get for a spherical inclusion with dielectric constant  and a radius  a polarisability :

If we combine  with the Clausius Mosotti equation, we get:

Where  is the effective dielectric constant of the medium,  of the inclusions;  is the volume fraction of the inclusions.
As the model of Maxwell Garnett is a composition of a matrix medium with inclusions we enhance the equation:

Validity 
In general terms, the Maxwell Garnett EMA is expected to be valid at low volume fractions , since it is assumed that the domains are spatially separated and electrostatic interaction between the chosen inclusions and all other neighbouring inclusions is neglected. The Maxwell Garnett formula, in contrast to Bruggeman formula, ceases to be correct when the inclusions become resonant. In the case of plasmon resonance, the Maxwell Garnett formula is correct only at volume fraction of the inclusions . The applicability of effective medium approximation for dielectric multilayers  and metal-dielectric multilayers  have been studied, showing that there are certain cases where the effective medium approximation does not hold and one needs to be cautious in application of the theory.

Formula describing size effect 
A new formula describing size effect was proposed. This formula has a form

It is supposed here that the time dependence of the electromagnetic field is given by the factor  In this paper Bruggeman's approach was used, but electromagnetic field for electric-dipole oscillation mode inside the picked particle was computed without applying quasi-static approximation. Thus the function  is due to the field nonuniformity inside the picked particle. In quasi-static region (i.e.  for Ag this function becomes constant  and formula (5) becomes identical with Bruggeman's formula.

Effective permeability formula 
Formula for effective permeability of mixtures has a form 

This formula was derived in dipole approximation. Magnetic octupole mode and all other magnetic oscillation modes of odd orders were neglected here. When  and  this formula has a simple form

Effective medium theory for resistor networks
For a network consisting of a high density of random resistors, an exact solution for each individual element may be impractical or impossible. In such case, a random resistor network can be considered as a two-dimensional graph and the effective resistance can be modelled in terms of graph measures and geometrical properties of networks.
Assuming, edge length is much less than electrode spacing and edges to be uniformly distributed, the potential can be considered to drop uniformly from one electrode to another.
Sheet resistance of such a random network can be written in terms of edge (wire) density, resistivity, width and thickness of edges (wires) as:

See also
 Constitutive equation
 Percolation threshold

References

Further reading
 
 
 
 
 

Condensed matter physics
Physical chemistry